Parveen Kaur (born 19 October 1988) is a Canadian actress. She is best known for playing Christine in Beyond and scientist Saanvi Bahl in Manifest.

Early life
Parveen was born on 1988-10-19 and raised in Okanagan Valley, British Columbia, Canada. She is of Punjabi ethnicity and a Sikh. At the age of 18, she moved to Toronto. She is a practitioner of yoga, hot yoga and mindfulness.

Career
Kaur only decided to pursue an acting career in her 20s after leaving high school early.
Kaur’s first recurring role came in Guillermo del Toro’s horror drama series The Strain in 2018, Kaur starred in the movie  Through Black Spruce   which premiered at the 2018 Toronto International Film Festival. Kaur starred as Saanvi for 4 seasons (44 episodes) of Manifest between 2018 and 2022.

Awards
Kaur received the 2017 MISAFF Star presented by ACTRA at the 6th annual Mosaic International South Asian Film Festival in Mississauga, Ontario.

Filmography

Film

Television

References

External links

21st-century Canadian actresses
1988 births
Actresses from Toronto
Canadian film actresses
Canadian actresses of Indian descent
Canadian people of Punjabi descent
Canadian Sikhs
Canadian television actresses
Living people